Edwards River may refer to:

The Edwards River (Mid Canterbury), a tributary of the Bealey River in New Zealand
The Edwards River (North Canterbury), a tributary of the (northern) Waiau River in New Zealand
The Edwards River (Illinois) in Illinois in the United States

See also 
 Edwards (disambiguation)
 Edward River (disambiguation)